Nice Witch is a 2018 South Korean television series starring Lee Da-hae, Ryu Soo-young, Ahn Woo-yeon, Bae Soo-bin and Yoon Se-ah. The series airs four consecutive episodes on Saturday on SBS TV from 8:55 p.m. to 11:15 p.m. (KST) from March 3 to May 5, 2018.

Cast

Main 
 Lee Da-hae as Cha Sun-hee / Cha Do-hee
 Ryu Soo-young as Song Woo-jin
 Ahn Woo-yeon as Oh Tae-yang

Supporting

People in Share House
 Shin Hye-jeong as Joo Ye-bin

Sun-hee's family
 Bae Soo-bin as Bong Chun-dae
 Ahn Sol-bin as Bong Chun-ji
 Geum Bo-ra as Byun Ok-jung
 Yang Geum-seok as Lee Moon-sook
  as Bong Cho-rong

Woo-jin's family
 Kim Yong-gun as Song Tae-joon
 Moon Hee-kyung as Kim Gong-joo

People in Royal Family Flight
 Yoon Se-ah as Oh Tae-ri
 Shim Hyung-tak as Chae Kang-min
 Lee Deok-hwa as Oh Pyung-pan

Extended
  as Gong Hyun-joon
  as Min Soo-hyun
  as Park Ki-bum
  as Cha Jong-chul
 Ha Jae-sook as Heo Min-ji
 Kim Ji-eun as Wang Ji-yeong

Ratings 
 In this table,  represent the lowest ratings and  represent the highest ratings.
 NR denotes that the drama did not rank in the top 20 daily programs on that date.

Awards and nominations

Notes

References

External links 
  

Seoul Broadcasting System television dramas
2018 South Korean television series debuts
Korean-language television shows
South Korean melodrama television series
2018 South Korean television series endings